The Harrisonburg Turks are a collegiate summer baseball team in Harrisonburg, Virginia. They play in the South Division of the Valley Baseball League, a collegiate wooden bat summer league consisting of 11 teams in the state of Virginia. The Turks have been coached and owned by Bob Wease for 31 years as of the end of the 2021 season. Wease is continuing in his roles for the 2022 season but has said that may be his final season. The Turks play their home games at Eagle Field at Veterans Memorial Park on the campus of James Madison University.

Notable alumni

Scott Cousins
Roy Corcoran
Rich Croushore
Steve Decker
David Eckstein
Steve Finley
Jesse Foppert
Danny Godby
Orlando Gonzalez
Travis Harper
Gary Hill
Ron Hodges
Chris Hoiles
Mike Hubbard
Daryl Irvine
Logan Kensing
Darren Lewis
Sean Maloney
Kirt Manwaring
Frank Menechino
Larry Mitchell
Oscar Múñoz
Tim Nordbrook
Talmadge Nunnari
Brian O'Connor
Jim Pankovits
Cliff Pennington
Juan Pierre
Greg Pryor
Jon Rauch
Billy Sample
Ryan Shealy
Doug Strange
Steve Swisher
Jeff Tam
Mo Vaughn
George Vukovich
Brian Wolfe
Jon Zuber

References

External links
Turks
Valley Baseball League

Amateur baseball teams in Virginia
Valley Baseball League teams
Harrisonburg, Virginia
Baseball teams established in 1915
1915 establishments in Virginia